The district duchy, also known as the district principality, was a type of the state under the patrimonial system, such as duchy or principality, formed in the feudal system, as a result of land partition between the members of a royal family. It occurred in the Middle Ages and early modern period, notably in Europe, in states such as the Holy Roman Empire, Duchy of Poland, and Kievan Rus'.

Holy Roman Empire

Bavaria

Bavaria-Ingolstadt
Bavaria-Landshut
Bavaria-Munich
Bavaria-Straubing

Mecklenburg

Mecklenburg-Güstrow
Mecklenburg-Schwerin
Mecklenburg-Stargard
Mecklenburg-Strelitz

Palatinate

Palatinate-Birkenfeld
Palatinate-Birkenfeld-Bischweiler
Palatinate-Birkenfeld-Gelnhausen
Palatinate-Birkenfeld-Zweibrücken
Palatinate-Kleeburg
Palatinate-Landsberg
Palatinate-Lautern
Palatinate-Mosbach
Palatinate-Mosbach-Neumarkt
Palatinate-Neuburg
Palatinate-Neumarkt
Palatinate-Simmern
Palatinate-Simmern and Zweibrücken
Palatinate-Simmern-Kaiserslautern
Palatinate-Simmern-Sponheim
Palatinate-Sulzbach
Palatinate-Sulzbach-Hilpoltstein
Palatinate-Zweibrücken
Palatinate-Zweibrücken-Birkenfeld
Palatinate-Zweibrücken-Vohenstrauss-Parkstein

Pomerania

 Pomerania-Demmin
 Pomerania-Stettin
 Pomerania-Schlawe
 Pomerania-Wolgast
 Pomerania-Stolp
 Pomerania-Neustettin
 Pomerania-Stargard
 Pomerania-Barth
 Pomerania-Rügenwalde
 Pomerania-Wolgast-Stolp

Saxony and Thuringia

 Saxe-Altenburg
 Saxe-Coburg
 Saxe-Coburg-Eisenach
 Saxe-Coburg-Saalfeld
 Saxe-Eisenberg
 Saxe-Coburg-Gotha
 Saxe-Eisenach 
 Saxe-Gotha 
 Saxe-Gotha-Altenburg 
 Saxe-Hildburghausen 
 Saxe-Jena 
 Saxe-Marksuhl 
 Saxe-Meiningen 
 Saxe-Römhild 
 Saxe-Saalfeld
 Saxe-Weimar 
 Saxe-Weimar-Eisenach

Poland

Original division 

 Seniorate Province (later reformed into the Duchy of Kraków)
 Duchy of Greater Poland
 Duchy of Sandomierz
 Duchy of Masovia
 Duchy of Silesia

Greater Poland 

 Duchy of Poznań
 Duchy of Gniezno
 Duchy of Kalisz

Masovia 

 Duchy of Czersk
 Duchy of Płock
 Duchy of Warsaw
 Duchy of Rawa
 Duchy of Belz
 Duchy of Wizna

Kuyavia 

 Duchy of Łęczyca
 Duchy of Sieradz
 Duchy of Brześć Kujawski
 Duchy of Inowrocław
 Duchy of Bydgoszcz and Wyszogród
 Duchy of Gniewkowo
 Duchy of Dobrzyń

Silesia

Others 
 Duchy of Wiślica (from the Duchy of Sandomierz)

Pomerelia 

 Duchy of Gdańsk
 Duchy of Świecie and Lubiszewo
 Duchy of Białogarda
 Duchy of Lubiszewo
 Duchy of Świecie

References 

Monarchy
Feudalism
Principalities
Dukedoms
Types of administrative division